Carlo Sickinger (born 29 July 1997) is a German professional footballer who plays as a midfielder for  club SV Elversberg.

Career
Sickinger made his professional debut for 1. FC Kaiserslautern in the 3. Liga on 8 December 2018, coming on as a substitute in the 75th minute for Theodor Bergmann in the 0–0 home draw against Würzburger Kickers.

On 26 January 2022, Sickinger joined SV Elversberg on loan. The transfer was made permanent at the end of the 2021–22 season and Sickinger signed a two-year contract with Elversberg.

References

External links
 
 

Living people
1997 births
Footballers from Karlsruhe
German footballers
Association football midfielders
1. FC Kaiserslautern II players
1. FC Kaiserslautern players
SV Sandhausen players
SV Elversberg players
2. Bundesliga players
3. Liga players
Regionalliga players